Euptagus is a genus of prehistoric sea urchins from the Miocene. It was up to 3 cm long.

References

Miocene animals